In statistical mechanics the Ornstein–Zernike (OZ) equation is an integral equation introduced  by Leonard Ornstein and Frits Zernike that relates different correlation functions with each other. Together with a closure relation, it is used to compute the structure factor and thermodynamic state functions of amorphous matter like liquids or colloids.

Context 

The OZ equation has practical importance as a foundation for approximations for computing the
pair correlation function of molecules or ions in liquids, or of colloidal particles. The pair correlation function is related via Fourier transform to the static structure factor, which can be determined experimentally using X-ray diffraction or neutron diffraction.

The OZ equation relates the pair correlation function to the direct correlation function. The direct correlation function is only used in connection with the OZ equation, which can actually be seen as its definition.

Besides the OZ equation, other methods for the computation of the pair correlation function include the virial expansion at low densities, and the Bogoliubov–Born–Green–Kirkwood–Yvon (BBGKY) hierarchy. Any of these methods must be combined with a physical approximation: truncation in the case of the virial expansion, a closure relation for OZ or BBGKY.

The equation 

To keep notation simple, we only consider homogeneous fluids. Thus the pair correlation function only depends on distance, and therefore is also called the radial distribution function. It can be written

where the first equality comes from homogeneity, the second from isotropy, and the equivalences introduce new notation.

It is convenient to define the total correlation function as:

 

which expresses the influence of molecule 1 on molecule 2 at distance . The OZ equation

splits this influence into two contributions, a direct and indirect one. The direct contribution defines the direct correlation function,  The indirect part is due to the influence of molecule 1 on a third, labeled molecule 3, which in turn affects molecule 2, directly and indirectly. This indirect effect is weighted by the density and averaged over all the possible positions of molecule 3.

Fourier transform 

The integral in the OZ equation is a convolution. Therefore, the OZ equation can be resolved by Fourier transform.

 

which yields

Closure relations

While the OZ equation is purely formal, the closure must introduce some physically motivated approximation.

In the low-density limit, the pair correlation function is given by the Boltzmann factor,

 

Closure relations for higher densities modify this simple relation in different ways. The best known closure approximations are:

 The Percus–Yevick approximation for particles with impenetrable ("hard") core,
 the hypernetted-chain approximation, for particles with soft cores and attractive potential tails,
 the mean spherical approximation,
 the Rogers-Young approximation.

The latter two interpolate in different ways between the former two, and thereby achieve a satisfactory description of particles that have a hard core and attractive forces.

References

External links 
 
 
 
 

Statistical mechanics
Integral equations